The Festivus is a publication about malacology and conchology published by the San Diego Shell Club in San Diego, California. The Festivus started in 1970 as a shell club newsletter edited by Blanche Brewer. In 1976 Carole Hertz became the editor, and gradually The Festivus became more scientifically respectable, and was transformed into a peer-reviewed scientific journal.  From 1985 up until 2014, issues of The Festivus contained scientific papers on mollusks, and each paper was peer-reviewed by a professional malacologist. Eleven issues were published annually: one issue per month, except for the month of December. Carole Hertz was editor for 37 years.

In March 2014, the editorship was changed: David P. Berschauer and David B. Waller became co-editors. The journal was altered in both format and scope; it became a quarterly publication in full color, and included scientific articles, popular articles and advertising. The focus of the journal continues to be scientific peer-reviewed articles, including descriptions of new taxa. Articles of general interest are also published, and are located in the back half of the journal. At the end of 2017, over 200 copies of The Festivus were printed and distributed each quarter.

Name
The publication was named in honor of a species of carnivorous sea snail which occurs locally: the "Festive Murex", previously known as Murex festivus, and now known as Pteropurpura festiva.

History
The Festivus was established in 1970 as a shell club newsletter edited by Blanche Brewer. Carole Hertz was the second editor, and after 1976, under her guidance, the publication grew and evolved into a scientific journal. The journal was published monthly from January through November each year. In 1984 the journal had a "sleek new look" and obtained an ISSN number. The front page of the January 1985 issue included for the first time a list of a Scientific Review Board of nine professional malacologists. By 2006, there were 13 professionals in the Review Board. Fifteen special issues and special supplements were published between 1978 and 2002.

During 1977, an error was made in the volume numbers printed in the journal issues. The first eight issues of 1977 were correctly shown as being part of Volume VIII. However, the last three issues of that year were listed as being part of Volume IX. Despite this error in numbering, there are in fact no "missing issues".

Change in format in 2014
In February 2014, it was announced that The Festivus was changing editorship and it would, from that point on, be published quarterly in both electronic and print format. In addition to scientific articles, popular articles of general interest and advertising were to be included. The first quarterly issue was published in May 2014, and this for the first time included articles naming new taxa. In 2018, the peer-review board consisted of over twenty professional malacologists worldwide.

Special supplements up to 2009
Occasionally, The Festivus has published special issues, and book-like "Special Supplements". The special issues and supplements published while Carole Hertz was editor are listed in this section. They are primarily in chronological order, except for two groupings by author.

Special Issues:

 February 1978, "The George Radwin Memorial Issue"
 October 1978, Superfamily, Muricacea: Catalogue of Coralliophilidae by Antony D'Attilio
 November 1979, "Interpretation of Typhine Morphology with Special Reference to Typhisala Clark (Keen & Campbell, 1964)

Supplement:

 January 1984, "Illustrations of the Types named by S. Stillman Berry in his "Leaflets in Malacology", by Carole M. Hertz

Special Issue:

 March 1980, "Seastar Predation on Mollusks in the San Felipe Bay Area, Baja California, Mexico", by Joyce Gemmell, Carole Hertz, and Barbara Myers

Supplements:

 March 1980, "A Faunal Study of the Bivalves of San Felipe and Environs, Gulf of California, from the Gemmell Collection (1965 to 1976)", 72 pages
 November 1988, "An Illustrated Catalogue of the Family Typhidae Cossman, 1903 (Gastropoda: Muricidae), By Anthony d'Attilio and Carole M. Hertz. 73 pages

Supplements by Carole Skogland 1991–2002 (grouped together):

 1991, "Additions to the Panamic Province Opisthobranchia (Mollusca) Literature 1971 to 1990" by Carol Skoglund
 1991, "Additions to the Panamic Province Bivalve (Mollusca) Literature 1971 to 1990" by Carol Skoglund
 1992, "Additions to the Panamic Province Gastropod (Mollusca) Literature 1971 to 1992" by Carol Skoglund
 2001, "Panamic Province Molluscan Literature Additions and Changes from 1971 through 2000, I Bivalvia II Polyplacophora",  by Carol Skoglund
 2002, "Panamic Province Molluscan Literature Additions and Changes from 1971 through 2001, III Gastropoda" by Carol Skoglund

Supplements by Kirstie L. Kaiser 1997–2001 (grouped together):

 1997, "The Recent Molluscan Marine Fauna of the Islas Galápagos" by Kirstie L. Kaiser, 67+ pages
 2001, "The Recent Molluscan Marine Fauna of the Isla de Malpelo, Colombia, by Kirstie L. Kaiser, 149+ pages

 1996, "The Genus Spondylus (Bivalvia: Spondylidae) of the Panamic Province" by Carol Skoglund and David K. Mulliner
 1996, "An Atlas of Cowrie Radulae (Mollusca: Gastropoda: Cypraeoidea: Cypraeidae)" by Hugh Bradner and E. Alison Kay, 179 pages

Special issue:

 2009, "Chitons known from the benthic monitoring program in the Southern California Bight" by T. Stebbins and D. Eernisse.

Newer special supplements and books

Published since March 2014, under the new editorship, were:

  2014, Iconography of the Haliotis Species and Subspecies of Australia and New Zealand by Buzz Owen and Robert Kershaw
  2015: The Living and Fossil Busycon Whelks: Iconic Mollusks of Eastern North America by Edward J. Petuch, Robert F. Myers, and David P. Berschauer
  2016: Chitons: The Polyplacophora from the Mexican Pacific by Adriana Reyes-Gomez
  2017: Aberrant Geomorphological Affinities in Four Conoidean Gastropod Genera, with the Descriptions of Fourteen New Hemilienardia Species from the Indo-Pacific by Shawn Wiedrick

References

External links
 The Festivus at Biodiversity Heritage Library
 

Malacology journals
Publications established in 1970
English-language journals
Academic journals published by learned and professional societies
Quarterly journals
1970 establishments in California